Einar Normann Rasmussen (22 August 1907 – 14 August 1975) was a Norwegian ship-owner and politician for the Liberal Party.

He was born in Vestre Moland as a son of a shipmaster, but moved to Kristiansand where he started his career as an office clerk in Christianssands Skibsassuranceforening from 1923 to 1936. In 1931 he took the examen artium as a privata candidate at Kristiansand Cathedral School. From 1936 he was a ship-owner.

He served as a deputy representative to the Parliament of Norway from Vest-Agder during the terms 1954–1957 and 1958–1961. In total he met during 31 days of parliamentary session. He was a member of Kristiansand city council from 1945 to 1955.

He was decorated with the Order of the Three Stars.

References

1907 births
1975 deaths
Norwegian businesspeople in shipping
Politicians from Kristiansand
Liberal Party (Norway) politicians
Deputy members of the Storting